Wookie may refer to:
 Wookie (musician), a UK garage musician
 The Louisiana Wookie, also known as the Honey Island Swamp Monster

See also
 Wookiee, a tall, hairy humanoid species in the Star Wars fictional universe
 Wookey, a village and civil parish 2 miles from Wells in Somerset, England